Lomatium engelmannii is an uncommon species of flowering plant in the carrot family known by the common name Engelmann's desertparsley, or Engelmann's lomatium. It is native to the Klamath Mountains of southern Oregon and northern California, where it is a member of the local serpentine soils flora.

Description
Lomatium engelmannii is a perennial herb growing 10 to 30 centimeters tall from a slender taproot. It lacks a stem, producing upright inflorescences and leaves from ground level. The leaves are up to about 30 centimeters long and are intricately divided into many lance-shaped segments. The inflorescence is an umbel of purplish flowers, the clusters on spreading rays up to 13 centimeters long.

External links
Calflora Database: Lomatium engelmannii (Engelmann's desertparsley,  Engelmann's lomatium)
Jepson eFlora (TJM2) treatment of Lomatium engelmannii
USDA Plants Profile for Lomatium engelmannii
UC CalPhotos gallery of Lomatium engelmannii 

engelmannii
Flora of California
Flora of Oregon
Flora of the Klamath Mountains
Endemic flora of the United States
Natural history of the California chaparral and woodlands
Natural history of the California Coast Ranges
Taxa named by Mildred Esther Mathias
Flora without expected TNC conservation status